The Porcupine Provincial Forest is a protected boreal forest in Canada which covers the Porcupine Hills on the border of Saskatchewan and Manitoba.


History 

By the end of the 19th century, Eastern Canada had essentially run out of marketable timber due to unsustainable logging techniques, land clearing for settlement and agriculture, and an increase in forest fires caused by settlement. In 1899, the Minister of the Interior Clifford Sifton appointed Elihu Stewart as the chief inspector of timber and forestry for the Dominion of Canada. Stewart's job was to protect undisturbed federal forests from unsustainable logging and settlement practices, and to revitalize lands that had already been deforested. Before 1905, the Porcupine Hills were located entirely within the Northwest Territories in the District of Saskatchewan, which meant that the Porcupine Forest was under full federal control. By 1901, a fire ranging service was established in Western Canada, and plans were made to determine which areas could be used for agriculture, and which areas would be left as forest.

In 1905, the Province of Saskatchewan was created, and its eastern border cut through the Porcupine Forest. Approximately 80% of the forest lay within the new province, and the other 20% remained within the Northwest Territories. Unlike the five eastern provinces and British Columbia, the three Prairie Provinces were not given control over their own natural resources. So even though Saskatchewan owned the land beneath the forest, they could not build infrastructure or settlements, or cut any wood, without permission of the federal government.

In 1906, the Canadian government passed the first Dominion Forest Reserves Act, which officially established the Porcupine Forest Reserve as a national forest. They hired forest rangers and built a headquarters at Ushta, Saskatchewan. Many of the first rangers were either forestry engineers from the University of New Brunswick, First World War veterans, or both. By 1914, the new forest reserve was overseen by 11 rangers, and 1 ranger-in-charge, and these rangers also oversaw the Pasquia Forest Reserve. In addition to the headquarters, 4 ranger cabins, 5 stables, and 4 fire towers were built for the rangers.

In 1930, the Saskatchewan Natural Resources Act was passed, which transferred control of Saskatchewan forests (and other natural resources) from the federal government to the Saskatchewan government. Once Saskatchewan officially received ownership of their natural resources, they created the Department of Natural Resources (DNR) to manage them. The rangers that had previously worked for the Dominion Forest Service now worked for the Saskatchewan DNR.

See also
 Porcupine Provincial Forest (Manitoba)
 List of Saskatchewan provincial forests
Porcupine Hills Provincial Park

References 

Forests of Saskatchewan
Forests of Manitoba